Aadi Khan is a Pakistani television actor. He is best known for portraying Waleed Kamil in Hum TV's Chupke Chupke. He also appeared in many other television series as a child actor. Besides acting in television series, he has acted in over 200 commercials also. Khan is the elder brother of child actor Sami Khan.

Television

References 

Year of birth missing (living people)
Living people
Place of birth missing (living people)
Pakistani male television actors
Hum TV people
Pakistani male child actors